WUSA (channel 9) is a television station in Washington, D.C., affiliated with CBS. It is the flagship property of Tegna Inc. (based in the nearby Virginia suburb of McLean). WUSA's studios and transmitter are located at Broadcast House on Wisconsin Avenue in the Tenleytown neighborhood on the northwestern side of Washington. WUSA is the third-largest CBS affiliate by market size (sister station KHOU in Houston being the second-largest and Gray Television's WANF in Atlanta being the largest) that is not owned and operated by the network.

The station's signal is relayed on a low-power digital translator station, W27EI-D, in Moorefield, West Virginia (which is owned by Valley TV Cooperative, Inc.). It also maintains a channel-sharing agreement with Silver Spring, Maryland-licensed WJAL (channel 68, owned by Entravision Communications).

History

Early years (1949–1978)
The station first went on the air on January 11, 1949, as WOIC, and began full-time operations on January 16. The fourth-oldest station in the nation's capital, channel 9 was originally owned by the Bamberger Broadcasting Service, a subsidiary of R. H. Macy and Company.  Bamberger also owned WOR-AM-FM in New York City, and was working to put WOR-TV (channel 9, now WWOR-TV in Secaucus, New Jersey) on the air at the same time. Nine days later, WOIC broadcast the first televised American presidential inaugural address, given by President Harry S. Truman. WOIC picked up the CBS affiliation upon signing on, replacing WMAL-TV (channel 7, now WJLA-TV) as the network's Washington outlet. WOIC/WTOP/WUSA has been a CBS affiliate since its inception, and is currently the network's longest-tenured affiliate. However, WOR was a shareholder in the Mutual Radio Network, which had plans to enter television with WOIC and WOR-TV as the flagship stations of its network; these plans never came to fruition. At the start of 1950, Bamberger Broadcasting changed its name to General Teleradio.

In June 1950, a joint venture of CBS and The Washington Post purchased WOIC from Bamberger/Macy's for $1.4 million. The new owners, WTOP Incorporated (the Post owned 55%, with CBS holding the remaining 45% stake), changed the station's call sign to WTOP-TV, after its new sister station WTOP radio (then at 1500 AM). Since WTOP took the callsign from the radio partners at the time, the callsign was a coincidence under ownership of the publisher, since they never stood for "Washington Post"; they instead stood for the fact that what was then known as WTOP was "at the top of [the city's] radio dial" (WTOP has been known as WFED since 2006, and is now owned by Hubbard Broadcasting, not by the Post). In July 1950, WTOP-TV became the first television station in Washington authorized to broadcast color television in the 405-line field sequential color standard, which was incompatible with the black-and-white 525-line NTSC standard. Color broadcasts continued for nearly 30 months, when regulatory and commercial pressures forced the FCC to rescind its original color standard and begin the process of adopting the 525-line NTSC-3 standard, developed by RCA to be backwards compatible with the existing black-and-white televisions.

In 1954, the WTOP stations moved into a new facility, known as "Broadcast House", at 40th and Brandywine Streets NW in Washington. The building was the first in the country designed as a unified radio and television facility. Its name was in honor of Broadcasting House, home of the BBC in London. The building was well known to WTOP's president, since he had spent much of World War II assigned to the BBC. Previous to the move to Broadcast House, the radio stations operated out of the Earle Building (now the Warner Building, home of the Warner Theatre), and WTOP-TV had operated out of the small WOIC studios at the same location. When Broadcast House was completed and the new television studios were inaugurated, the old studio became the garage for Broadcast House and the old master control room became both the master control and transmitter room for channel 9, since Broadcast House had been built around the station's original, four-sided tower. The building with the tower remains in the middle at the same location, although it is now an office building and retail store front.

The WTOP-TV tower was known in Washington for two things. First, at Christmas time, the tower was strung with Christmas lights and glowed brightly on top of Mount Reno, the tallest point in the District of Columbia. Second, the tower tended to sway much more than three-sided towers. In a strong wind, the tower could be seen swaying back-and-forth, and during the winter ice from the tower fell quite often on the streets below.

In October 1954, CBS sold its share of WTOP Inc. to the Washington Post to comply with the FCC's new seven-station-per-group ownership rule. CBS's partial ownership of WTOP radio, KQV radio in Pittsburgh and WCCO radio in Minneapolis exceeded the FCC's limit for AM radio stations. CBS opted to sell its share of WTOP, which it had purchased in whole in 1932 before selling controlling interest to the Post in 1949.

After the sale closed, the Post merged the WTOP stations with its other broadcast property, WMBR-AM-TV in Jacksonville, Florida, and changed the name of the licensee from "WTOP Inc." to "Post Stations, Inc." WMBR radio was sold off in 1958, and WMBR-TV became WJXT. The Post renamed its broadcasting group "Post-Newsweek Stations" in 1961 after the Post bought Newsweek magazine. Post-Newsweek acquired its third television station, WLBW-TV (now WPLG) in Miami in 1970 and in 1974 added WTIC-TV (now WFSB) in Hartford, Connecticut, to the group. Transmission lines were extended from Broadcast House's transmitter area to the new tower for both WTOP-TV and WHUR-FM (the former WTOP-FM, which had been donated by Post-Newsweek to Howard University in 1971). The old tower continued to serve as the backup antenna for channel 9 until the station sold Broadcast House in 1996.

In 1974, WTOP and the other Post-Newsweek stations adopted the slogan "The One and Only". The moniker was part of a trend toward group identification of stations, with each station being "The One and Only Channel (channel number)". Staff members from the "One and Only" period usually refer to themselves as "the one and onlies" as a source of pride. The slogan was dropped from active use in the late 1990s and has not been used as part of an image campaign since 1996. The slogan no longer appears on-air, but was revived in a sense when channel 9 adopted its slogan in the mid 2000s, First and Only with Local News in HDTV.

Later years (1978–present)
On June 26, 1978, Post-Newsweek exchanged WTOP-TV with the Evening News Association's WWJ-TV (now WDIV-TV) in Detroit. That same day, WTOP-TV changed its call letters to WDVM-TV, with the new call letters representing the initials of the areas which channel 9 serves: District of Columbia,  Virginia and Maryland. Post-Newsweek parent the Washington Post Company, and the Evening News Association, which published the Detroit News, decided to swap their stations for fear that the FCC would force them to sell the stations at unfavorable terms or revoke their very valuable licenses because the FCC at the time was considering forbidding ownership of newspapers and broadcast stations in the same market. The call letter was changed as per a now-repealed FCC rule stating that TV and radio stations in the same market, but with different ownership had to use different callsigns.

In 1985, the Gannett Company purchased the Evening News Association. This marked the group's first CBS station since the company had sold then-network affiliate WHEC-TV in Rochester in 1979. On July 4, 1986, Gannett changed channel 9's call letters to WUSA both in honor of the station being located in the nation's capital and Gannett's ownership of USA Today. The WUSA callsign had previously been used by Gannett's station (previously WTCN-TV) in Minneapolis for a year, which simultaneously changed its callsign to KARE. The WDVM-TV callsign is now in use on an unrelated station in Hagerstown, Maryland.

At the time, particularly in Gannett press releases, the station's callsign was commonly printed as "W★USA". However, the asterisk or star between the "W" and "U" is not part of the call sign. The star device was used to denote its connection to USA Today. The star was replaced on-air with the CBS Eye Device, which is also not part of the call sign, in the late 1990s as CBS began to considerably relax their formerly strict branding guidelines for their affiliates (which had not allowed blending the logo into call letters), and to reduce confusion with the now-defunct Women's United Soccer Association, which was also visually represented as "W★USA" within their logo.

WUSA moved to a new Broadcast House at 4100 Wisconsin Avenue NW in January 1992. WTOP-FM had left the old Broadcast House in 1971, but kept its transmitter there. WTOP radio departed in 1978; the Post had sold it a year earlier to the Outlet Company. The move to the more modern building was tinged with sadness due to the death from a brain tumor of popular sportcaster Glenn Brenner just days before the move. In 1998, WUSA launched its website, wusatv9.com, but later removed the "TV" reference in the domain name to become wusa9.com.

Around the first week of October 2012, Gannett entered a dispute against Dish Network regarding compensation fees and Dish's AutoHop commercial-skip feature on its Hopper digital video recorders. Gannett ordered that Dish discontinue AutoHop on the account that it is having a negative effect on advertising revenues for WUSA. Gannett threatened to pull all of its stations (such as WUSA) should the skirmish continue beyond October 7 and Dish and Gannett fail to reach an agreement. The two parties eventually reached an agreement after extending the deadline for a few hours.

On June 29, 2015, the Gannett Company split in two, with one side specializing in print media and the other side specializing in broadcast and digital media. WUSA was retained by the latter company, named Tegna.

Websites
In July 2007, WUSA launched a second website at DVMmoms.com . The site focused on topics relating to young mothers in the Washington, D.C. area. Gannett also rolled out similar sites targeted at moms in other select markets where it owns a television and/or newspaper properties. In February 2008, WUSA launched a third website at DVMOurTime.com. The site is fronted by noon anchor J. C. Hayward and provides local restaurant and business discounts as well as news and events targeted towards baby boomers.

In 2008, Gannett and the Tribune Company partnered to expand the Metromix brand that has been successful for many years in Chicago at the Chicago Tribune. WUSA's local Metromix.com site launched in July 2008. There are 35 other Gannett and/or Tribune properties that have a Metromix site. In August 2008, Gannett revamped its moms sites, and DVMmoms.com was renamed MomsLikeMe.com. Like the previous versions, the site features topics related to young moms and includes technology from Ripple 6, which was recently acquired by Gannett. There were MomsLikeMe.com sites in 85 other markets throughout the country. MomsLikeMe was phased out in 2012.

In September 2008, WUSA's fifth website was launched, called HighSchoolSports.net. The site features, among other things, high school sports rankings, schedules, and scores for high school football, soccer, basketball and baseball games around the United States. The site is also a Gannett-owned property that was launched in many markets throughout the country.

In June 2010, Gannett Broadcasting and DataSphere Technologies announced a partnership to create community-focused websites in 10 of their television station markets. WUSA was one of the first to launch these sites in August 2010. The sites are integrated within the existing website and feature hyperlocal news and user-generated content about area happenings and events. In addition to powering the community websites, DataSphere provides enhanced functionality, including market-leading site search, coupons, a business directory and ad targeting. WUSA created 53 different neighborhood sites in the Metro D.C. area.

Programming
Syndicated programs broadcast by WUSA include Entertainment Tonight, Inside Edition,  and Dr. Phil. The latter three are distributed by CBS' corporate cousin CBS Media Ventures.

WTOP was one of the few CBS stations that declined to carry the popular game show The Price Is Right during the early years of the program's run (although Washington, D.C. ABC station WMAL-TV/WJLA-TV (channel 7) did carry The Price Is Right and some other CBS daytime game shows uncleared by WTOP during the mid 1970s).

During the September 11 attacks in 2001, WUSA made the decision to preempt CBS' national coverage of the attacks on The Pentagon and the World Trade Center with its own local coverage; this decision proved controversial. As a local affiliate, WUSA did not possess the resources to cover the attacks as extensively as the national network, and its decision to institute a "CBS blackout" prevented its audience from viewing much of the national reporting anchored by Dan Rather, although CBS News coverage was available on multiple Viacom-owned networks, including MTV and VH1. The Washington Post criticized this decision, writing, "The city was subjected to a CBS blackout by the local affiliate, Gannett-owned Channel 9. The station chose to view this, incredibly enough, as a local story and reported it initially as if it were a winter snow day and school closings were of the utmost importance." Criticism aside, at 9:41 a.m., just four minutes after the impact, WUSA broke into the CBS national coverage and showed smoke billowing from The Pentagon. Their local coverage, like that of other Washington-area affiliates, included reporters on the phone and on camera, eyewitness accounts, and analysis. WUSA continuously stayed on the air, covering the exodus of the District, school closures, and traffic issues until 12:42 p.m. Throughout the rest of the afternoon, WUSA provided local news updates and press conferences, alternating between their local coverage and the national feed.  

From May 2008 until the end of its original run in 2016, WUSA served as the production studio for the program The McLaughlin Group which was also broadcast on some select CBS stations (including its New York City owned-and-operated station WCBS-TV) beginning in May 2007 and on some PBS member stations (locally via WETA-TV and WHUT-TV); the show was distributed by WTTW out of Chicago, with the production facilities moved over from NBC owned-and-operated station WRC-TV, where the show had been based since its premiere in 1982.

Sports programming
Then-WTOP-TV was the first television partner of the Washington Capitals, signing a three-year contract to broadcast 15 road games per year at the team's debut in the 1974–75 NHL season. Warner Wolf commentated for the first season before being replaced by a simulcast of Ron Weber's call for WTOP radio. WTOP-TV treated the games as an afterthought and often relegated them to joins-in-progress or tape-delays to late night. Although Washington Post beat reporter Robert Fachet called the team's state of television affairs "revolting" by the contract's end, station management openly stated they received far more complaints about the preempted CBS shows than from Capitals fans. The Capitals moved to WDCA (channel 20) for 1977.

The then-Washington Bullets also signed their first television deal with WTOP-TV when they moved to the city in 1973, concurrent with the start of national broadcasts of the league on CBS. The Bullets moved their local games to WDCA as well in 1977.

Additionally, the station aired select weekend Washington Nationals games produced by MASN from 2013 until 2017.

News operation

WUSA presently broadcasts 33 hours, 15 minutes of locally produced newscasts each week (with 5 hours, 35 minutes each weekday; 2 hours, 5 minutes on Saturday; and 3 hours, 5 minutes on Sunday); in addition, the station produces a sports highlight program called Game On!, which airs Sunday evenings after the 11 p.m. newscast. WUSA was the launchpad for several well-known news anchors. Sam Donaldson and Warner Wolf are among WUSA's most successful alumni. Max Robinson was co-anchor of Eyewitness News with Gordon Peterson from 1969 to 1978 before he became the first black anchorman on network television and one of the original anchors of ABC World News Tonight. James Brown of CBS Sports was a sports anchor at the station in the 1980s.

In 1989, WUSA debuted an hour-long newscast at 4 p.m. (replacing The Oprah Winfrey Show, which the station chose not to continue carrying due to the program's licensing fees, it then moved to WJLA-TV), which created a three-hour local news block from 4 to 7 p.m., resulting in a half-hour delay of the CBS Evening News to 7 p.m. The 4 p.m. newscast was dropped in 2000, with WUSA also cutting a half-hour off the end of its 4–7 p.m. news block, moving the CBS Evening News to 6:30 p.m., the recommended timeslot for the network newscast for CBS stations located in the Eastern Time Zone. As of August 2020, WUSA is the only major station in the Washington market that does not carry a 4:00 p.m. newscast.

On May 2, 2005, WUSA became the first television station in the Washington market to begin broadcasting its local newscasts in high definition.

In February 2012, WUSA launched its investigative unit with Chief Investigative Reporter Russ Ptacek. Ptacek's investigations led to reform after uncovering millions in unreported government bonuses, a utility allowed to charge customers during disconnections caused by storms, taxis refusing passengers based upon race, and potentially deadly restaurant food safety risks. Ptacek and WUSA9 parted ways in 2016 when the station announced changes to its investigative direction.

Anchor and consumer correspondent Lesli Foster reported on a petition filed by the Center For Auto Safety asking government safety regulators to recall millions of older model Jeep Grand Cherokees. The consumer group believes the placement of the plastic gas tanks in those vehicles can lead to fires and deaths when they are struck from behind. The gas tank is located behind the rear axle—literally in the crush zone of the vehicle. Chrysler says the vehicles are safe and not defective. The automaker points out that in the 26 fatal accidents cited by NHTSA where they can calculate kinetic energy, the deaths in all those vehicles involved speeds that exceed today's crash test requirements. But the company agreed to recall over 1 million of the remaining 1993–1998 models, along with 2002–2007 Jeep Liberty's back in June of last year. Lesli Foster was acknowledged for her hard hitting investigative report in 2013 with a NCCB-NATAS Emmy Award.

Beginning with the noon newscast on January 17, 2013, WUSA unveiled a new graphics package for the station's newscasts designed for Gannett's news-producing stations by design firm The Mill; the new graphics are designed to reduce on-screen clutter, which viewers complained about prior to the change to the new standardized graphics. With the change, WUSA began using the AFD #10 broadcast flag to present their newscasts in letterboxed widescreen for viewers watching on cable television through 4:3 television sets. Additionally, the station unveiled its new logo, which was stylized as "wusa⋆9", in lower-case lettering.

Beginning with Wake Up Washington on April 26, 2018, WUSA unveiled a new set to replace the previous one used since the May 2, 2005 HD launch, along with a new station logo which ended the use of any stars and/or asterisks in WUSA's branding. It also rolled out a new standardized graphics and music package for the station's newscasts designed for Tegna's news-producing stations.

Notable current on-air staff

 Kristen Berset – anchor, sports reporter
 Darren M. Haynes – sports director 
 Topper Shutt (AMS Seal of Approval) – chief meteorologist
 Reese Waters – anchor

Notable former on-air staff
 Martin Agronsky – journalist/host of Agronsky and Company 1969–1988; now deceased
 Jess Atkinson – sports anchor (2000–2002, now back at his alma mater, the University of Maryland)
 Ellison Barber – reporter (2015–2017); now at Fox News Channel
 Glenn Brenner – sports anchor and later sports director (1977–1992); now deceased
 Anita Brikman – anchor/health reporter (2007–2013; now Senior Vice President of Strategic Communications for the National Hospice and Palliative Care Organization in Alexandria, Virginia)
 James Brown – sports anchor (1984–1990; now at CBS Sports)
 Maureen Bunyan – anchor/reporter (1973–1995; last at WJLA-TV)
 Walter Cronkite – Channel 9's first anchorman (1950–1954); later at CBS News, now deceased
 Chet Curtis – reporter (later at WCVB-TV, and NECN, died in January 2014)
 Sam Donaldson – anchor/reporter (1961–1967; now retired)
 Kristin Fisher – reporter (2009–2013); now at sister station KING-TV in Seattle
 Angie Goff – traffic/entertainment reporter (2001–2007); moved to WRC-TV (2011–2018); joined WTTG in June 2019
 Erica Grow – meteorologist (2012–2015; now at WPIX in New York City)
 Brett Haber – sports director (2004–2011; now editor-at-large at Washingtonian magazine and Tennis Channel play-by-play commentator)
 J. C. Hayward – anchor (1972–2015); retired
 Frank Herzog – sports anchor and reporter (1969–1983 and 1992–2004, retired)
 Doug Hill – chief meteorologist (1984-2000); now deceased
 Hillary Howard (Statter) – meteorologist (2000–2004; now at WTOP-FM)
 Jan Jeffcoat – morning anchor (2013–2018; now at rival WJLA-TV and lead anchor of Sinclair Broadcast Group's The National Desk)
 Bruce Johnson – anchor/reporter (1976–2020); now deceased
 Susan King – anchor/reporter (1975–1979); now a dean at the UNC Hussman School of Journalism and Media
 Doug Llewelyn – anchor/reporter (1970–1976; later known as host/court reporter for the original People's Court)
 Davey Marlin-Jones – film critic and entertainment reporter (1970–1987); now deceased
 Andrea McCarren – anchor/reporter/investigative reporter (1992–1995 and 2009–2018; now Vice President and Chief Content Officer at Pentagon Federal Credit Union) 
 Todd McDermott – anchor (2004–2008, now at WPBF in West Palm Beach)
 Derek McGinty – anchor (2003–2015)
 Andrea Mitchell – reporter (1976–1978, now at NBC News)
 Warren Olney – reporter (1966–1969, later worked in Los Angeles)
 Ralph Penza – reporter (1979–1980); now deceased
 Tony Perkins – anchor (2019–2022, now at WRC-TV)
 Gordon Peterson – anchor/reporter (1969–2004, retired)
 Russ Ptacek – investigative reporter (2012–2016) now president of VNI Television.
 Levan Reid – sports reporter/weekend sports anchor (2003–2008; now in the same position at WBZ-TV in Boston)
 Andrea Roane – anchor/reporter (1981–2018); retired
 Max Robinson – anchor/reporter (1969–1978); now deceased
 Bill Shadel – reporter (1950); now deceased
 Warner Wolf – sports anchor (1965–1976 and 1992–1996, was most recently at WABC (AM) in New York City until December 2016)
 Eun Yang – reporter/anchor (1995–2001, now at WRC-TV)

Technical information

Subchannels
The station's digital signal is multiplexed:

On November 1, 2011, WUSA signed an affiliation agreement to add Bounce TV, which launched on WUSA digital subchannel 9.2, on December 16, 2011.

In August 2017, WUSA temporarily stopped carrying its subchannels due to technical considerations involving their channel sharing arrangement with WJAL (virtual channel 68), which moved its signal to WUSA's transmitter on October 1, 2017, and moved its city of license from Hagerstown, Maryland, to Silver Spring. In the interim, Bounce arranged a new affiliation agreement with Univision to be carried on WFDC-DT, and moved its Capital Region affiliation to WFDC-DT4. Justice Network returned later in the month on WUSA-DT2 once the move was completed.

Analog-to-digital conversion
WUSA stopped transmitting on its analog signal, over VHF channel 9, on June 12, 2009, the official date in which full-power television stations in the United States transitioned from analog to digital broadcasts under federal mandate. The station's digital signal relocated from its pre-transition UHF channel 34 to VHF channel 9 for post-transition operations.

Translator

Notes

References

External links

 
 
 

CBS network affiliates
True Crime Network affiliates
Quest (American TV network) affiliates
Tegna Inc.
USA (TV)
Television channels and stations established in 1949
National Football League primary television stations
1949 establishments in Washington, D.C.
Former Gannett subsidiaries